Lục Yên is a rural district of Yên Bái province, in the Northeast region of Vietnam. As of 2019, the district had a population of 108,817. The district covers an area of 811 km2. The district capital lies at Yên Thế. Numerous quarries in the district produce gemstones such as rubies, spinel, and tourmaline.

Administrative divisions
Lục Yên is divided into 24 commune-level sub-divisions, including the township of Yên Thế and 23 rural communes (An Lạc, An Phú, Động Quan, Khai Trung, Khánh Hòa, Khánh Thiện, Lâm Thượng, Liễu Đô, Mai Sơn, Minh Chuẩn, Mường Lai, Minh Tiến, Phan Thanh, Phúc Lợi, Tân Lập, Tân Lĩnh, Tân Phượng, Tô Mậu, Trúc Lâu, Trung Tâm, Vĩnh Lạc, Minh Xuân, Yên Thắng).

References

Districts of Yên Bái province
Yên Bái province